Venecia is the Spanish name for Venice. It may also refer to:

 Venecia, Antioquia, town and municipality in Colombia
 Venecia, Bogotá, neighborhood of Bogotá, Colombia
 Venecia, Cundinamarca, town and municipality in Colombia
 Venecia (TransMilenio), a station in Bogotá, Colombia
 Venecia, the original title of the 2014 Cuban film Venice

See also
 De Venecia, a surname
 Venice (disambiguation)